Gelsi Caballero is a Nicaraguan footballer who plays as a midfielder for the Nicaragua women's national team.

International career
Caballero made her senior debut for Nicaragua on 6 October 2019 as a 57th-minute substitution in a 2–1 win over El Salvador during the 2020 CONCACAF Women's Olympic Qualifying Championship qualification.

References 

Living people
Nicaraguan women's footballers
Women's association football midfielders
Nicaragua women's international footballers
Year of birth missing (living people)